Zebina robustior is a species of minute sea snail, a marine gastropod mollusk or micromollusk in the family Zebinidae.

Description
The size of the shell varies between 2.5 mm and 4.2 mm.

Distribution
This species occurs in the Atlantic Ocean off Western Sahara and Senegal.

References

 Gofas S. (1999). The West African Rissoidae (Gastropoda: Rissooidea) and their similarities to some European species. The Nautilus 113(3): 78-101
 Gofas, S.; Le Renard, J.; Bouchet, P. (2001). Mollusca, in: Costello, M.J. et al. (Ed.) (2001). European register of marine species: a check-list of the marine species in Europe and a bibliography of guides to their identification. Collection Patrimoines Naturels, 50: pp. 180–213

External links
 

robustior
Gastropods described in 1999